Vice Admiral Sir James Edward Campbell Kennon KCB CBE (26 November 1925 – 22 January 1991) was a Royal Navy officer who ended his career as Chief of Fleet Support.

He was educated at Stowe School.

Naval career
Kennon joined the Royal Navy in 1945. On promotion to rear admiral, he was appointed Assistant Chief of the Naval Staff (Policy) in 1978 and Port Admiral at Rosyth as well as Chief Naval Supply & Secretariat Officer in 1979. Following promotion to vice admiral, he became Chief of Fleet Support in 1981. In that capacity he managed the run-down of Chatham Dockyard before he retired in 1983. He died in January 1991.

References

1925 births
1991 deaths
Military personnel from Liverpool
Royal Navy vice admirals
Knights Commander of the Order of the Bath
Commanders of the Order of the British Empire
People educated at Stowe School
Royal Navy logistics officers